Directorate General of Drug Administration (DGDA) is the principal drug regulatory agency in Bangladesh and it functions under the Ministry of Health and Family Welfare.

History
Directorate General of Drug Administration was established in 1976 under the Ministry of Health and Family Welfare as a separate department. It was upgraded on 17 January 2010. The department is responsible for issuing licenses to pharmaceutical companies. The  Drug Control Committee of the department decides on drug registration.

References

Government agencies of Bangladesh
1976 establishments in Bangladesh
Organisations based in Dhaka
Drugs in Bangladesh